The University of Yaoundé II (French: Université de Yaoundé II) is a public university in Cameroon, located in the capital Yaoundé. It was formed in 1993 following a university reform that split the country's oldest university, the University of Yaoundé, into two separate entities: the University of Yaoundé I and the University of Yaoundé II.

Notable alumni 
Ajomuzu Collette Bekaku, CEO and founder of Cameroon Association of the Protection and Education of the Child
Odette Melono, Deputy Director-General of the Organisation for the Prohibition of Chemical Weapons, Ambassador of Cameroon to the Netherlands and Luxembourg
Solange Yijika, actress
Lambert Sonna Momo, CEO de Global ID, specialized in 3D Finger Vein biometric identification.

References

Yaounde II
Educational institutions established in 1993
1993 establishments in Cameroon